The 1981 Soviet Cup was an association football cup competition of the Soviet Union. The winner of the competition, SKA Rostov qualified for the continental tournament.

Competition schedule

Group stage
Games took place between February 20 – March 5, 1981.

Group 1
 [Uzhgorod, Mukachevo]
 1.Dinamo Kiev                  5   4  1  0   9- 1   9  Qualified 
 2.Kayrat Alma-Ata              5   3  0  2   8- 4   6  Qualified 
 -----------------------------------------------------
 3.Karpaty Lvov                 5   2  2  1   8- 4   6 
 4.Prikarpatye Ivano-Frankovsk  5   1  3  1   1- 1   5 
 5.Nistru Kishinev              5   1  2  2   3- 6   4 
 6.Khimik Grodno                5   0  0  5   1-14   0

Group 2
 [Sochi, Adler]
 1.Shakhtyor Donetsk            4   3  1  0   6- 2   7  Qualified 
 -----------------------------------------------------
 2.Metallurg Zaporozhye         4   2  1  1   6- 2   5  
 3.Kuzbass Kemerovo             4   2  1  1   2- 2   5 
 4.Kuban Krasnodar              4   1  1  2   4- 5   3 
 5.Lokomotiv Samtredia          4   0  0  4   0- 7   0

Group 3
 [Leningrad]
 1.Zenit Leningrad              5   3  1  1  18- 9   7  Qualified 
 2.Iskra Smolensk               5   3  1  1   9- 5   7  Qualified 
 -----------------------------------------------------
 3.Neftchi Baku                 5   2  2  1   9- 8   6 
 4.Torpedo Kutaisi              5   1  3  1   5-11   5 
 5.Zarya Voroshilovgrad         5   1  2  2   6- 7   4 
 6.SKA Khabarovsk               5   0  1  4   3-10   1

Group 4
 [Kislovodsk, Lermontov]
 1.Dinamo Minsk                 4   2  2  0   4- 1   6  Qualified 
 -----------------------------------------------------
 2.Spartak Orjonikidze          4   1  3  0   4- 2   5  
 3. Guria Lanchkhuti             4   0  4  0   4- 4   4 
 4.Dinamo Stavropol             4   0  3  1   2- 3   3 
 5.Dnepr Dnepropetrovsk         4   0  2  2   3- 7   2

Group 5
 [Moskva]
 1.Dinamo Moskva                5   4  1  0   9- 2   9  Qualified 
 2.CSKA Moskva                  5   4  0  1  13- 4   8  Qualified 
 -----------------------------------------------------
 3.Žalgiris Vilnius             5   3  1  1  10- 7   7 
 4.Shinnik Yaroslavl            5   2  0  3   7- 6   4 
 5.Torpedo Togliatti            5   1  0  4   4-12   2 
 6.SKA Kiev                     5   0  0  5   1-13   0

Group 6
 [Dushanbe, Nurek, Kurgan-Tyube]
 1.Pamir Dushanbe               5   4  1  0   8- 1   9  Qualified 
 2.SKA Rostov-na-Donu           5   3  0  2   4- 4   6  Qualified 
 -----------------------------------------------------
 3.Pahtakor Tashkent            5   2  2  1   3- 2   6 
 4.Dinamo Samarkand             5   1  2  2   4- 6   4 
 5.Buston Jizak                 5   1  1  3   2- 5   3 
 6.Traktor Pavlodar             5   1  0  4   4- 7   2

Group 7
 [Sevastopol, Yalta]
 1.Chernomorets Odessa          5   4  0  1  10- 5   8  Qualified
 2.Lokomotiv Moskva             5   3  1  1   9- 5   7  Qualified  
 -----------------------------------------------------
 3.Tavria Simferopol            5   3  0  2   8- 5   6 
 4.Kolos Nikopol                5   3  0  2   9- 7   6 
 5.Fakel Voronezh               5   1  1  3   5- 9   3 
 6.Dinamo Barnaul               5   0  0  5   4-14   0

Group 8
 [Yerevan, Oktemberyan]
 1.Metallist Kharkov            5   4  0  1   8- 2   8  Qualified 
 2.Ararat Yerevan               5   3  1  1   9- 5   7  Qualified 
 -----------------------------------------------------
 3.SKA Odessa                   5   3  0  2   6- 6   6 
 4.Torpedo Moskva               5   2  1  2   6- 5   5 
 5.Spartak Kostroma             5   1  0  4   1- 5   2 
 6.Rotor Volgograd              5   1  0  4   4-11   2

Play-off stage

Round of 16
 [Mar 12] 
 ARARAT Yerevan          2-1  Dinamo Tbilisi      [aet] 
   [Andranik Khachatryan 2, Ashot Saakyan 95 – Ramaz Shengelia 22. Att: 37,000] 
 CHERNOMORETS Odessa     1-0  CSKA Moskva 
   [Vasiliy Ishchak 39. Att: 18,000] 
 DINAMO Kiev             3-0  Kayrat Alma-Ata     [in Uzhgorod] 
   [Vladimir Bessonov 17, Oleg Blokhin 37 pen, Alexandr Kokorev (K) 80 og. Att: 5,500] 
 DINAMO Minsk            1-0  Pamir Dushanbe      [in Leningrad] 
   [Yuriy Kurnenin 24 pen. Att: 2,000] 
 SKA Rostov-na-Donu      3-1  Iskra Smolensk 
   [Alexandr Vorobyov 53, Alexandr Zavarov 57, Viktor Kuznetsov 64 – 
    Vladimir Nikonov 7. Att: 10,000] 
 SPARTAK Moskva          1-0  Shakhtyor Donetsk 
   [Sergei Shvetsov 61. Att: 25,000] 
 Zenit Leningrad         0-2  DINAMO Moskva 
   [Alexandr Minayev 62, Nikolai Latysh 64] 
 [Mar 13] 
 Lokomotiv Moskva        2-2  METALLIST Kharkov   [pen 0-3] 
   [Vladimir Mukhanov 20, Yevgeniy Drozzhin 107 – Stanislav Bernikov 79, 
    Vladimir Linke 93. Att: 5,000]

Quarterfinals
 [Mar 21] 
 DINAMO Moskva           1-1  Chernomorets Odessa  [pen 4-2] 
   [Nikolai Latysh 48 – Vladimir Ustimchik 41. Att: 10,000] 
 METALLIST Kharkov       1-0  Dinamo Minsk         [aet] 
   [Stanislav Bernikov 94. Att: 36,000] 
 SKA Rostov-na-Donu      2-1  Ararat Yerevan       [aet] 
   [Viktor Kuznetsov 80, Igor Gamula 104 – Samvel Kasaboglyan 84. Att: 25,000] 
 [Mar 22] 
 SPARTAK Moskva          3-0  Dinamo Kiev 
   [Fyodor Cherenkov 22, Yevgeniy Sidorov 28, 36. Att: 35,000]

Semifinals
 All games played on April 27
 Dinamo Moskva           0-1  SKA Rostov-na-Donu 
   [Igor Gamula 8. Att: 5,200] 
 Metallist Kharkov       0-0  SPARTAK Moskva      [pen 2-4] 
   [Att: 37,000]

Final

External links
 Complete calendar. helmsoccer.narod.ru
 1981 Soviet Cup. Footballfacts.ru
 1981 Soviet football season. RSSSF

Soviet Cup seasons
Cup
Soviet Cup
Soviet Cup